is a village located in Yoshino District, Nara Prefecture, Japan.

As of October 2016, the village has an estimated population of 1,310 and a density of 7.5 persons per km2. The total area is 175.70 km2.

Education
 Kindergartens
 Tenkawa Preschool Kindergarten
 Primary Schools
 Tenkawa Elementary School
 Junior High Schools
 Tenkawa Junior High School
 Dorogawa Junior High School

Notable places
 Yoshino-Kumano National Park
 Dorogawa Hot Springs
 Ten-no-kawa Hot Springs
 Mount Ōmine Temple
 Mount Ōmine Ryusenji Temple
 Mitarai Valley

See also
 Mount Omine

External links

Tenkawa official website 

Villages in Nara Prefecture